Wrath Tour was a concert tour by American heavy metal band Lamb of God in support of the group's sixth studio album, Wrath, which was released in February 2009.

The tour began in November 2008 with a headline date in the band's hometown of Richmond, Virginia. The following month, the band toured North America as the main support act to Metallica on their World Magnetic Tour. The group met controversy when they were banned from playing at The Forum in Inglewood, California, where Metallica were booked for two dates. Faithful Central Bible Church, the owners of The Forum, refused to let the group perform after they had learned the band formerly went by the name "Burn the Priest". This was the second occasion Lamb of God ran into a dispute with the venue; the group were previously banned from performing in 2005 while supporting Slipknot on their Subliminal Verses Tour. The group announced shows in outlying cities in lieu of the ban.

In February 2009, the band toured Europe; a number of the U.K. dates were part of a package tour sponsored by Metal Hammer dubbed "Defenders of the Faith" featuring Dimmu Borgir as co-headliners. The group then toured Australia through March as part of the Soundwave Festival, which was headlined by Nine Inch Nails and Alice in Chains. In April 2009, the group began a headlining North American tour, sponsored by No Fear Energy. The leg began in Phoenix, Arizona and wrapped up mid-May in North Myrtle Beach, South Carolina. In July 2009, during a European summer tour, guitarist Mark Morton exited the tour prior to the final six dates as he and his wife were expecting their first child. Morton was replaced by Buz McGrath of Unearth for the remaining summer dates, and Doc Coyle of God Forbid for.the first three weeks of a fall North American leg. Morton eventually rejoined the group in October in Tampa, Florida.

The show in Prague at Abaton on May 24, 2010 was the subject of manslaughter charges against vocalist Randy Blythe in 2012 and 2013. The court eventually ruled that Blythe was not criminally liable and acquitted him on March 5, 2013.

Tour dates
 
 1^ Date supporting Metallica.
 2^ Date part of the "Metal Hammer: Defenders of the Faith" tour featuring co-headliners Dimmu Borgir.
 3^ Headline date; non-festival appearance.
 4^ Date featuring co-headliners In Flames.
 5^ Date featuring co-headliners Testament.

 Canceled dates

Support acts
 3 Inches of Blood (December 10, 2008; July 7, 8, 12, 19 and 29, 2010; August 9 and 15, 2010)
 As I Lay Dying (April 2 – May 15, 2009)
 August Burns Red (February 8 – March 12, 2010)
 Between the Buried and Me (February 8 – March 12, 2010)
 Children of Bodom (April 2 – May 8, 2009)
 DevilDriver (December 11–18, 2009)
 God Forbid (April 2 – May 15, 2009)
 Gwar (September 21 – November 7, 2009)
 Hatebreed (July 7, 8, 12, 19 and 29, 2010; August 9 and 15, 2010)
 High on Fire (December 11–18, 2009)
 The Faceless (December 9, 11, 16–19, 2008)
 Five Finger Death Punch (February 8–17, 2009)
 In Flames (February 23 and 24, 2009)
 Job for a Cowboy (December 16 and 18, 2008; September 21–27, 2009; October 29 – November 7, 2009; February 9 – March 12, 2010)
 Municipal Waste (November 24, 2008; April 2 – May 15, 2009)
 Shadows Fall (December 9–18, 2009)
 The Sword (December 6, 9–11 and 19, 2008)
 Subtract (December 9, 2009)
 Unearth (February 11–15, 2009; March 4–6, 2009)

References

Lamb of God (band) concert tours
2008 concert tours
2009 concert tours
2010 concert tours